Ishrat Fatima is a retired Pakistani footballer who was the first captain of Pakistan women's national football team. A midfielder, she led the team at the inaugural edition of the South Asian Games women's football tournament held in Dhaka, Bangladesh in early 2010.

Career

Domestic
In the National Women's Championships, Fatima represented Sports Sciences Department of the University of Punjab.

International
Fatima was chosen as Pakistan's first women's football team captain. She led the team which place fourth at the South Asian Games held in Dhaka, Bangladesh in 2010

Coach
After her playing career, Fatima became the coach of Margalla WFC based in Islamabad.

References

Pakistani women's footballers
Pakistan women's international footballers
Living people
Sportspeople from Lahore
Women's association football midfielders
Year of birth missing (living people)